alive is a monthly Canadian natural health and wellness magazine. The magazine provides readers with information on leading healthy lifestyles, and focuses on a range of topics from natural health, organics, fitness, beauty, and nutrition, to holistic healing, emotional health and sustainability. The headquarters of the magazine is in Richmond, British Columbia. alive is distributed in Canadian health retailers and can be purchased through personal subscriptions.

History
The magazine was started in Vancouver in 1975 by Canadian Health Reform Products for the Canadian Health Food Association. It is published by Alive Publishing Group Inc. Notable contributors include William E. Rees and  David Suzuki.

In June 2008, Masthead Online reported that alive ranked 31st in revenues of all Canadian magazines, and had a readership (according to the Print Measurement Bureau) of 562,000.

References

External links
 Official website

1975 establishments in British Columbia
Health magazines
Lifestyle magazines published in Canada
Magazines established in 1975
Magazines published in British Columbia
Magazines published in Vancouver
Monthly magazines published in Canada